The Moderator of the United Church of Canada is the most senior elected official within the United Church of Canada. He or she may be a lay person or a member of the Order of Ministry and is elected to a three-year term by commissioners attending the church's triannual General Council. The current Moderator is the Right Reverend Dr. Carmen Lansdowne, who was elected to the office at the 44th General Council in July 2022, and installed on August 7, 2022.

Role 
The Moderator's authority exists by his or her ability to influence the direction of the denomination, rather than any sort of direct power to unilaterally enact changes. Duties of the Moderator include:
 giving leadership ("especially in spiritual things, quickening in the hearts of the people a sense of God as revealed in Christ, and heartening and strengthening the whole United Church")
 visiting pastoral charges across the country, "giving sympathetic guidance and counsel giving sympathetic guidance and counsel, and reporting to the General Council and its executive".
 being the primary spokesperson and representative for the United Church
 presiding at the meetings of the United Church's highest court, the triannual General Council, and chairing meetings of the General Council's Executive and Sub-Executive.

History of the office 
When the United Church of Canada was founded in 1925, General Councils were biannual, giving each moderator a two-year term of office. (The first exception was the first moderator, George C. Pidgeon, who only served for one year. The second was the 43rd moderator, Richard Bott, who had his term extended to four years when the 44th General Council was postponed by one year due to the COVID-19 pandemic.) At the 1994 General Council, the commissioners voted to make General Councils triannual, thus increasing the moderator's term to three years. 

Although most moderators have been ordained ministers, this is not a requirement of office, and to date, four moderators have been lay persons. If the moderator is ordained, he or she is styled the "Right Reverend" while in office, and the "Very Reverend" afterwards.

Current and past Moderators 

Source:

References

Canadian clergy